Lekhgaun may refer to:

Lekhgaun, Bheri
Lekhgaun, Seti